J.J. Belle (born Roger Elvidge Belle, French Guiana, 17 October 1955 – 26 November 2004) was a renowned British session musician, mostly known for his work as a guitarist. Artists he played for included Marc Almond, Fish (playing guitar on the US leg and September UK dates of his 1997 Sunsets on Empire tour), Debbie Harry, Johnny Hates Jazz, Grace Jones, George Michael, Madonna, Dusty Springfield,Bucks Fizz - with a song-defining solo at the end of ‘The Company You Keep’ and Tina Turner. He also played on Belouis Some's 1993 album Living Your Life. Belle also frequently worked with the Pet Shop Boys, who declared he helped define their sound in a statement following his death from cancer in 2004.

References

External links 
J.J. Belle at AllMusic
J.J. Belle at Discogs
J.J. Belle at Internet Movie Database
Facebook memorial page

1955 births
2004 deaths
British male guitarists
British session musicians
20th-century British guitarists
20th-century British male musicians
20th-century British musicians